Refusal to share，(Japanese: どうたんきょひ) in Japanese means to refuse to share. Refusal to share is one of the ways for otaku (pop culture lovers) to express their position. It specifically refers to a fixed phrase that conveys that the supported object is an object that does not want to be shared with other fans of the same type. Correspondingly, there is "same responsibility and welcoming (同担歓迎)".

Concept
In short, the concept is to refuse to share artists with fans. It is an attitude that refuses to associate and know the same fans. The first appeared in the fan group of Johnny & Associates.Fans refer to their favorite artist A as "A responsible" (A担当), and artist A becomes the fan's "responsible" (担当). If you support the same artist, it is called "the same burden". "Together with responsibility" (同担)expresses the refusal to share liking artists with others, and it also means "together with NG"(同担NG).
Johnny's fans in the late 1990s carried a business card showing who they were in charge of, which was also used to refuse to share. Later, terms such as "in charge" and the derivative word "joint share" came to be used not only by Johnny's fans but also by idol fans and anime fans.

Psychological
It seems that there are various types of refusal to share, and not everyone refuses to share. Fans in their own community will not refuse even if they share the same role, but there are also people who refuse to share the same role outside the community. In addition, although they are usually close friends with each other, there are cases where a feeling of refusal comes out from the sense of competition when they are seated next to each other in front of the support target such as a concert hall.
The feeling of refusal to share is influenced by the common characteristics found in the Johnny's fan base who gave birth to this word. Johnny's fans look at the support target with a sense of intimacy, and place importance on enhancing the relationship with the target. This is different from the traditional music fan base, who sees the target person's performing arts activities with a longing feeling.
On the other hand, Johnny's fans generally have a low self-esteem about their appearance, and from this background, they may interfere with the relationship with the support target and become a rival or a target of jealousy. The exchange is refused. In addition to sharing with the person himself, he may refuse to share with a close friend. This aims to maintain good relationships within the group by ensuring that the responsibilities do not overlap within the group of fans. In order to avoid sharing, the group of Johnny's fans is usually small, which is different from the Guard, where fans of the same idol form a large group.

References

Japanese culture
Otaku slang
Fandom